Trapezites macqueeni, the Macqueen's skipper, is a butterfly of the family Hesperiidae. It is found in north Queensland, Australia, in the hills away from the coast.

The wingspan is about 30 mm.

The larvae feed on Lomandra filiformis.

External links
 Australian Caterpillars

Trapezitinae
Butterflies described in 1970